Coltricia is a genus of fungi in the family Hymenochaetaceae. It was circumscribed by Samuel Frederick Gray in 1821. Common name is "Tiger's Eye Fungus".

Species
Coltricia abieticola
Coltricia africana
Coltricia albidipes
Coltricia arenicola
Coltricia australica
Coltricia bambusicola
Coltricia barbata
Coltricia cinnamomea
Coltricia confluens
Coltricia crassa
Coltricia cylindrospora
Coltricia duportii
Coltricia fibrosa
Coltricia focicola
Coltricia fonsecoensis
Coltricia fragilissima
Coltricia globispora
Coltricia grandispora
Coltricia hamata
Coltricia haskarlii
Coltricia kinabaluensis
Coltricia macropora
Coltricia minor
Coltricia montagnei
Coltricia oblectabilis
Coltricia opisthopus
Coltricia perennis
Coltricia permollis
Coltricia progressus
Coltricia pseudocinnamomea
Coltricia pyrophila
Coltricia salpincta
Coltricia spina
Coltricia strigosa
Coltricia strigosipes
Coltricia subfastosa
Coltricia subperennis
Coltricia truncicola
Coltricia tsugicola
Coltricia velutina
Coltricia verrucata
Coltricia weii

References

Hymenochaetaceae
Agaricomycetes genera
Taxa named by Samuel Frederick Gray
Taxa described in 1821